Carlos Nieto (born 25 June 1976) is an Italian Argentine international rugby union player.

Nieto made his Italy debut against England in the 2002 Six Nations but did not manage to establish himself as an automatic choice in the front row.

He was recalled by Berbizier to the national set-up for the 2005 Summer tour of Argentina and Australia. He was one of Italy's best players during the 2006 Six nations championship even though he missed the final game against Scotland because of injury.

In the 2006 he signed for Gloucester Rugby.

In 2009, Nieto signed for Saracens. He started for Saracens as they won their first Premiership title in 2011.

On May 2, 2013, Nieto announced he will retire at the end of the 2012/13 season.

References

External links
RBS 6 Nations profile
Gloucester Rugby Profile

1976 births
Living people
Sportspeople from La Plata
Argentine rugby union players
Italian rugby union players
Argentine emigrants to Italy
Gloucester Rugby players
Italy international rugby union players
Italian expatriate rugby union players
Expatriate rugby union players in England
Italian expatriate sportspeople in England
Rugby union props